The Ferrari 412 T1 was the Formula One racing car with which Scuderia Ferrari competed in the 1994 Formula One World Championship. It was designed by John Barnard and then developed by Gustav Brunner.

Overview

The car was a simple and straightforward design that worked well, powered by a 3.5 litre V12 engine. 
In the name of the new car, the 4 stood for the number of valves per cylinder while the 12 was for the number of cylinders and the T referred to the transverse gearbox with its six normal gears and one reverse. The car featured heavily sculptured sidepods and a sleek rounded nosecone, aiding aerodynamics.

The car was continually upgraded with redesigned sidepods and wings throughout the season. So many changes were made that the later cars were called the 412 T1B. 
A new engine named Tipo 043 debuted at the 1994 San Marino Grand Prix qualifying sessions, and was first raced in Hockenheim.  It was designed from scratch by Claudio Lombardi and former Honda F1 chief engine designer Osamu Goto with a wider vee-angle of 75 degrees (up from 65 degrees) and a shorter stroke, replacing the old Tipo 041; Ferrari had brought on a number of engineers from the successful Honda F1 engine program. The 043 became famous for its great amount of power (over 830 bhp) and for its characteristic noise.

The 412 T1 put Ferrari on the right track after several seasons of poor competitiveness in the early 1990s. Gerhard Berger and Jean Alesi proved the car's competitiveness throughout the season, with a brace of podium finishes and some pole positions. Ferrari returned to Grand Prix success after a long break, with Berger winning the 1994 German Grand Prix.

For the following year a new car, the 412 T2 came out which received many changes that aided both aero and safety.

Complete Formula One results
(key) (results in bold indicate pole position; results in italics indicate fastest lap)

References

External links 
 AUTOCOURSE 1994-95 by Alan Henry

1994 Formula One season cars
412 T1